The Recovery Tour was a series of European concerts by American rapper Eminem, in support of his 2010 album Recovery as well as his 2009 album Relapse. Instead of widely touring the album, Eminem took the tour to three European festivals, performing to over 200,000 people over three nights. In November 2010, Eminem headlined the F1 Rocks 2010 in São Paulo. In the following year, another eight shows on festivals in North America and Europe were announced. The tour was also extended to three stadium shows in Australia that took place in December 2011. He stopped touring due to his daughter, Hailie missing him while he was away. Eminem is now touring again starting in 2023.

Background
Eminem had stated before the release of Relapse that he would not tour the album, due to his daughter, Hailie, not liking him being away from home. However, on 23 February 2010, it was announced that Eminem would return to the live stage by headlining three major European festivals - T in the Park 2010 in Scotland, Oxegen 2010 in Ireland and Openair Festival in Frauenfeld, Switzerland. Eminem's website quoted him as saying: "I’m excited to get back to Europe to rock some shows. The crowds there are always big, crazy and dedicated ... it’s going to be great to feel that energy again."

The official press release also revealed that Eminem would be joined by D12 on each of the dates. Another festival – the F1 Rocks 2010 – was added to the tour in fall of 2010.

Opening acts
 Lil Wayne (Australia)
 Slaughterhouse (Asia) & (Europe) - Slane  & Paris
 Kendrick Lamar (Europe) - Glasgow & Paris
 Yelawolf (Europe) - Slane & Glasgow
 Odd Future (Europe) - Slane, Glasgow & Paris
 Plan B (Europe) - Slane (Only)

Tour dates

Cancelled shows

Setlist

References

External links
Official site

2010 concert tours
2011 concert tours
2012 concert tours
2013 concert tours
Eminem concert tours